Julian Valentin (born February 23, 1987) is an American retired professional soccer player.

Career

Amateur
A four-year starter at Wake Forest University, Valentin appeared in 84 games from 2003-2007. Named NSCAA First Team All-South and Second Team All-America, Soccer America First-Team All-American and All-ACC First Team in 2006, Valentin was also named to ESPN's Academic All-District III team and was one of three NCAA starters on U-20 Men's National Team. Valentin captained the Demon Deacons to their first NCAA National Championship title in 2007 and famously took a cleat to the face in the final minutes of the game.

Professional
Valentin was selected by the Los Angeles Galaxy with the 29th overall pick in the 2008 MLS SuperDraft. With the MLS Reserve Division having been scrapped at the end of 2008, the LA Galaxy loaned Valentin to Cleveland City Stars in the USL First Division on May 15, 2009.

Valentin signed with USSF Division 2 club FC Tampa Bay on 5 February 2010 and was named club captain on 6 April 2010.

On 3 February 2011, Valentin officially retired from professional play and accepted a job with the Colorado Rockies of Major League Baseball. Valentin is of Puerto Rican descent. Valentin is the older brother of Zarek Valentin of Portland Timbers and brother in-law of Taylor Kemp of D.C. United.

References

External links
 
 
 Wake Forest bio

1987 births
Living people
Sportspeople from Lancaster, Pennsylvania
American soccer players
American people of Puerto Rican descent
Soccer players from Pennsylvania
Wake Forest Demon Deacons men's soccer players
LA Galaxy players
Cleveland City Stars players
Tampa Bay Rowdies players
Major League Soccer players
USL First Division players
USSF Division 2 Professional League players
United States men's youth international soccer players
United States men's under-20 international soccer players
United States men's under-23 international soccer players
LA Galaxy draft picks
Association football defenders